Chutani (also Romanized as Chūtānī; also known as Sheykh Bāzār) is a village in Pir Sohrab Rural District, in the Central District of Chabahar County, Sistan and Baluchestan Province, Iran. As of the 2006 census, its population was 330 with 69 families.

References 

Populated places in Chabahar County